Izzah Binti Amzan (born 19 October 2000) is a Malaysian rhythmic gymnast.

Early life and background
Izzah was born in Mentakab, Pahang. She is the youngest of three siblings. She took up gymnastics at the age of five after her yoga instructor mother introduced her to the sport.

Athletic career
Izzah made her international senior debut in 2016. She represented Malaysia at the 2017 Southeast Asian Games and at age 17 became one of Malaysia’s youngest athletes to compete at the SEA Games. At the 2019 Southeast Asian Games, she won two gold medals and one silver. She was selected to represent Malaysia at the 2022 Commonwealth Games and won a bronze medal in the individual clubs event and finishing fourth in both the team all-around and individual all-around competitions.

Awards and accolades

References

External links 
 

2000 births
Living people
Malaysian rhythmic gymnasts
Gymnasts at the 2022 Commonwealth Games
Commonwealth Games bronze medallists for Malaysia
Commonwealth Games medallists in gymnastics
People from Pahang
Southeast Asian Games gold medalists for Malaysia
Southeast Asian Games silver medalists for Malaysia
Southeast Asian Games medalists in gymnastics
Competitors at the 2019 Southeast Asian Games
21st-century Malaysian women
Medallists at the 2022 Commonwealth Games